Vital João Geraldo Wilderink (November 30, 1931 in Deventer, Netherlands – June 10, 2014) was a Dutch-born Brazilian who presides as the Roman Catholic bishop of the Roman Catholic Diocese of Itaguaí, Brazil.

Ordained to the priesthood in 1957, he was appointed a bishop in 1978 and as bishop of the Itaguaí Diocese in 1980. Bishop Wilderink resigned in 1998.

Notes

20th-century Roman Catholic bishops in Brazil
20th-century Dutch Roman Catholic priests
1931 births
2014 deaths
Dutch emigrants to Brazil
Roman Catholic bishops of Barra do Piraí-Volta Redonda
Roman Catholic bishops of Itaguaí
People from Itaguaí